Una Max is an album by the drummer Louis Hayes, recorded in 1989 and released on the Danish SteepleChase label.

Reception 

The AllMusic review stated: "This rewarding date is worthy of wider recognition".

Track listing 
 "El Cid" (Clint Houston) – 7:14
 "Ibis" (Kenny Barron) – 9:30
 "You Don't Know What Love Is" (Gene de Paul, Don Raye) – 9:36
 "Geri" (Houston) – 9:35
 "Una Max" (Louis Hayes, Houston) – 7:41
 "Saudade" (Houston) – 8:24
 "Ruthie's Heart" (Charles Tolliver) – 9:15

Personnel 
Louis Hayes – drums
Charles Tolliver – trumpet
Gerald Hayes – alto saxophone
John Stubblefield – tenor saxophone
Kenny Barron – piano
Clint Houston – bass

References 

Louis Hayes albums
1990 albums
SteepleChase Records albums